Eugenio Leonel Méndez Henríquez (born 23 November 1941) is a Chilean former football winger who played professionally in Chile, Mexico, Ecuador and Bolivia.

Club career
Born in Valparaíso, Méndez began playing football as a right winger with Santiago Wanderers. He made his Chilean league debut against Audax Italiano in 1959. After nine years with Wanderers, he joined Deportes Magallanes, as Wanderers won its second Chilean league title the same year. Méndez returned to Wanderers and played in the 1969 Copa Libertadores.

In 1973, Méndez moved abroad, joining Mexican Primera División side Club de Fútbol Laguna. Next, he played in Ecuador for Sociedad Deportiva Aucas before returning to Santiago Wanderers in 1974. A few seasons later, he moved to Bolivia where he finished his playing career.

International career
Méndez represented Chile at youth level in 1959.

At senior level, Méndez appeared for the Chile national football team in the 1966 FIFA World Cup qualifying rounds, scoring two goals in a 7–2 win against Colombia on 1 August 1965. In total, he made 4 appearances for the national team from 1964 to 1965.

Personal life
He is the older brother of Javier Méndez, who is also a Chilean former international footballer.

He was nicknamed Pastelito (Little Cake).

Honours
Santiago Wanderers
 Copa Chile (2): 1959, 1961

Chile
  (1):

References

External links

Profile at Sanluissa.cl
 Eugenio Méndez at MemoriaWanderers 

1941 births
Living people
Sportspeople from Valparaíso
Chilean footballers
Chile international footballers
Chile under-20 international footballers
Chilean expatriate footballers
Santiago Wanderers footballers
Deportes Magallanes footballers
Deportes La Serena footballers
Audax Italiano footballers
S.D. Aucas footballers
San Luis de Quillota footballers
C.D. Jorge Wilstermann players
Magallanes footballers
Chilean Primera División players
Primera B de Chile players
Liga MX players
Ecuadorian Serie B players
Bolivian Primera División players
Chilean expatriate sportspeople in Mexico
Chilean expatriate sportspeople in Ecuador
Chilean expatriate sportspeople in Bolivia
Expatriate footballers in Mexico
Expatriate footballers in Ecuador
Expatriate footballers in Bolivia
Association football wingers
Chilean football managers
Chilean expatriate football managers
Club Destroyers managers
Sport Boys Warnes managers
Bolivian Primera División managers
Expatriate football managers in Bolivia